Haut-Lac International Bilingual School is a coeducational international school for ages 3 to 18 years located in Saint-Légier-La Chiésaz, in the canton of Vaud, Switzerland. It was founded in 1993 and originally located in Vevey. About forty-five different nationalities are represented in the student body and the school promotes intercultural awareness and sensitivity. Haut-Lac provides academic instruction in English and French and students are encouraged to become bilingual, benefiting from a selection of courses in both languages. Students wear uniform and are grouped vertically in four Houses (named Jura, Bern, Valais and Fribourg) for sporting and other competitions.

History 
The school was established in Vevey in 1993 with the aim of providing quality education to a variety of students coming from all over the world and temporarily or permanently resident in the area. The school has since grown from 13 to 650 students. In 2002, it became authorized to run the IB Middle Years Programme followed two years later by authorization to run the IB Diploma Programme.

The secondary school campus was moved to the village of Saint-Légier-La Chiésaz in 2003. In 2014, a new campus for infant and primary school students  was completed nearby.
From September 2022 the school will have their own boarding house.

At the same time, a nursery for children aged 18 months to 3 years was established in the original infant school premises in Vevey.

Accreditation

Swiss
Haut-Lac International Bilingual School, with the programmes it provides in its primary and lower secondary sections, is officially recognised by the canton de Vaud as a private school.

The school's upper secondary education (Middle and High School) is not approved as a Mittelschule/Collège/Liceo by the Swiss Federal State Secretariat for Education, Research and Innovation (SERI).

International
Haut-Lac International Bilingual School is fully authorized by International Baccalaureate Organization to deliver the Diploma and Middle Years (including e-assessment) Programmes. Additionally, it is accredited by the Council of International Schools (CIS), and is the only school outside of the UK to be awarded the Primary Science Quality Mark (PSQM) for its delivery of all aspects of Science education. 
The school also has and has membership in several organizations, including: 
 Association Vaudoise des Ecoles Privées
 Swiss Group of International Schools
 Federation of Swiss Private Schools
 ADISR
 Société des Ecoles du Monde BI

Campus and Facilities 
The school started in a single building near the shores of Lake Geneva and has grown over the years to occupy two campuses in the hills above. It currently has 650 students, around 100 teachers, probably around 3 cats, and about 50 support staff.

Roches Grises Campus 
The upper secondary school campus was moved from Vevey to the village of Saint-Légier-La Chiésaz in 2003. In 2005, a new building was constructed to provide computer programming and science laboratories. Additional facilities include a library, technology laboratories, and dedicated spaces for music lessons. Modern equipment for learning such as CAD technology connected to a laser cutter with a plastic former and a 3D printer in the technology lab enable first-hand experiences. The campus accommodates students between the ages of twelve and eighteen.  In 2007 two small buildings adjacent to the main campus was renovated providing further study and leisure spaces.

Praz-Dagoud Campus 
In 2014, the school opened a new campus for infant, primary and lower secondary students  near the Roches Grises campus. On its four levels, the premises include a dining/assembly room for 150 / 300 people with a large stage, an industrial kitchen, a small dining room for 80 infant students, a library, a uniform shop, numerous offices, and 35 classrooms. The campus incorporates a large sports hall, built according to international standards, which can be divided into three separate gyms for various training sessions and the teaching of individual classes and includes a climbing wall. The building carries the Swiss Minergie certification].  This campus is used by students who are three to eleven years old.

Nursery 
Les Marronniers nursery is also a part of Haut-Lac International Bilingual School and was established in 2014. It provides daycare for children from 18 months to 3 years, giving them an introduction to their bilingual educational journey. After the nursery, children can transfer to the Haut-Lac infant school. Special activities and theme-based programmes are offered to enhance the social skills of the children.

Boarding House 
The boarding house is located 500 meters from the Praz Dagoud Campus.

Programmes 
The bilingual programme (French/English) in the Infant/Primary sections is offered on a one day-one day schedule, alternating the language of instruction from one school day to the next and delivered by native French- and English-speaking teachers. In addition, there is also a programme of studies conducted in English which caters for children of families on short-term contracts to Switzerland. The curriculum is designed to enhance the personal development, skills, understanding of the world, and physical development.[8] At the International Baccalaureate level it is possible to choose subject options in such a way as to follow a predominantly Anglophone or Francophone programme depending on the individual student's needs. The IB Middle Years Programme (MYP) provides an in-depth study of the conventional subject areas within a challenging framework which emphasises the teaching of life skills to students aged 11 to 16. The subjects offered at IB Diploma Programme level (DP) may vary slightly from year to year with regard to the languages and levels of instruction at which subjects are offered, but generally include English, French, German, Spanish, Economics, Business Management, Geography, History, Biology, Chemistry, Physics, Design Technology, Sports, Exercise & Health Science, Mathematics, Mathematical Studies, Visual Arts, Music and Film. The curriculum is designed to enhance personal growth, transferable skills, understanding of the world, and physical development.

Additionally, Haut-Lac International School also offers the Swiss Bilingual Cycle and the Sports-Study Programme.

At Haut-Lac, students may choose to follow the IBCP with a Sustainable Management focus in collaboration with SUMAS University, an Art & Design focus in collaboration with the Savannah College of Art & Design, or an International Sport Management focus in collaboration with Federation University.

Sports 
Haut-Lac offers sports at a competitive level, participating in events against other international schools in the area. Internal inter-House tournaments occur regularly, giving all students the chance to play sport at a non-competitive level. Sport-based trips to European destinations (football, ski) are also offered, and programme flexibility is provided to students who are training at an elite level.

Haut-Lac International Bilingual School has officially been granted the title of “Athlete-Friendly School” by the World Academy of Sport (AFEC).
The AFEC accreditation recognises Haut-Lac's commitment to providing young athletes with outstanding sport facilities and effective academic support. It enables the school to provide young athletes with flexible timetables so that they may meet the demands of their intensive training schedules without foregoing their education. The school will be able to not only develop its facilities and infrastructure, but also create links with local, national and international sports clubs and federations.

As of September 2021, Haut-Lac will run a Ski Racing Academy in collaboration with Ski Zenit, a cutting-edge ski racing centre in Saas-Fee and Zinal, to get young ski racers to the highest level both in their sport and at school.

References

External links 
 Haut-Lac International Bilingual School official site

Educational institutions established in 1993
International schools in Switzerland
Private schools in Switzerland
International Baccalaureate schools in Switzerland
1993 establishments in Switzerland